Gladstone High School may refer to one of several high schools:

Gladstone High School (California) in Covina, California
  Gladstone High School (Michigan) in Gladstone, Michigan
Gladstone High School (Oregon) in Gladstone, Oregon
  Gladstone High School (South Australia) in Gladstone, South Australia